Let There Be Rock: The Movie – Live in Paris is a live double album by the hard rock band AC/DC, released as "Disc Two" and "Disc Three" of the Bonfire box set in 1997. It is also the soundtrack to the film AC/DC: Let There Be Rock. It is the last album Bon Scott recorded with the band before he died, just two months before his death and was released posthumously.

Overview 
The album was recorded live on 9 December 1979 at the Pavillon de Paris in Paris, France, during their Highway to Hell World Tour.

A motion picture of this concert, entitled AC/DC: Let There Be Rock, was released theatrically and on videotape in 1980, and on DVD on 7 June 2011. However, the movie does not contain the performance of "T.N.T." included on this album. The album also does not contain the band interviews found on the film. Dave Grohl from the Foo Fighters said that as a kid after seeing the movie in a cinema he was so overawed and exhilarated that he wanted to go home to his guitar, not to play it but to smash it.

Though this album shares a name with AC/DC's fourth studio album, Let There Be Rock, it also includes live versions of songs from T.N.T., Powerage, and Highway to Hell. The cover used on Disc Three of the Bonfire box set featured similar cover art to that used on the international and current Australian editions of the Let There Be Rock album, and on the movie poster and videotape package of AC/DC: Let There Be Rock.

The album is one of two live albums on the Bonfire set, the other being Live from the Atlantic Studios. Both albums are two of three live albums in an AC/DC rarity box set, the other being Live Rarities in Backtracks.

Track listing
Disc one
 "Live Wire" – 8:04
 "Shot Down in Flames" – 3:39
 "Hell Ain't a Bad Place to Be" – 4:31
 "Sin City" – 5:25
 "Walk All Over You" – 5:06
 "Bad Boy Boogie" – 13:20

Disc two
 "The Jack" – 6:05
 "Highway to Hell" – 3:30
 "Girls Got Rhythm" – 3:20
 "High Voltage" – 6:32
 "Whole Lotta Rosie" – 4:55
 "Rocker" – 10:45
 "T.N.T." – 4:13
 "Let There Be Rock" – 7:34

Australian version
 "Live Wire" – 8:04
 "Shot Down in Flames" – 3:39
 "Hell Ain't a Bad Place to Be" – 4:31
 "Sin City" – 5:25
 "Bad Boy Boogie" – 13:20
 "The Jack" – 6:05
 "Highway to Hell" – 3:30
 "Girls Got Rhythm" – 3:20
 "High Voltage" – 6:32
 "Whole Lotta Rosie" – 4:55
 "Rocker" – 10:45
 "Let There Be Rock" – 7:34

All songs composed by Angus Young, Malcolm Young and Bon Scott.
In the accompanying CD booklet, Mark Evans was incorrectly credited with playing bass. He was no longer a member of the band by the time the concert was filmed.

Personnel
Bon Scott – lead vocals
Angus Young – lead guitar
Malcolm Young – rhythm guitar, backing vocals
Cliff Williams – bass guitar, backing vocals
Phil Rudd – drums

References

1997 live albums
1997 soundtrack albums
AC/DC live albums
East West Records live albums
Concert film soundtracks
Albums recorded at Pavillon de Paris